Africanella is a genus of sea snails, marine gastropod mollusks in the family Muricidae, the murex snails or rock snails.

Species
Species within the genus Africanella include:

 Africanella coseli (Houart, 1989)
 Africanella isaacsi (Houart, 1984)

References

Ocenebrinae
Gastropod genera